The 1996 IAAF Grand Prix Final was the twelfth edition of the season-ending competition for the IAAF Grand Prix track and field circuit, organised by the International Association of Athletics Federations. It was held on 7 September at the Arena Civica in Milan, Italy.

Daniel Komen (5000 metres) and Ludmila Engquist (high jump) were the overall points winners of the tournament. A total of 18 athletics events were contested, ten for men and eight for women.

Medal summary

Men

Women

References
IAAF Grand Prix Final. GBR Athletics. Retrieved on 2015-01-17.

External links
IAAF Grand Prix Final archive from IAAF

Grand Prix Final
Grand Prix Final
International athletics competitions hosted by Italy
Sports competitions in Milan
1990s in Milan
IAAF Grand Prix Final
IAAF Grand Prix Final